Baftan (also Romanized as Bāftān) is a village in Abarghan Rural District, in the Central District of Sarab County, East Azerbaijan Province, Iran. At the 2006 census, its population was 645, in 145 families.

References 

Populated places in Sarab County